St. John Paul II High School is a private, Roman Catholic high school in Corpus Christi, Texas. It is located in the Roman Catholic Diocese of Corpus Christi.

Background
John Paul II High School is located in Corpus Christi on the Texas Gulf Coast, and within the Roman Catholic Diocese of Corpus Christi. The high school began its inaugural year on August 1, 2006, with only one class of freshmen. Each year a new grade level was added until the school had a four year high school, spanning grades nine through twelve. The creation of John Paul II High School was the vision and inspiration of Bishop Edmond Carmody. As a Catholic school, its purposes are to provide a unique environment in which students can experience the presence of the Holy Spirit. Its focus is on the individual person's spiritual, moral, intellectual, social, cultural and physical development.
The school graduated its first class of seniors in 2010; it is named in honor of Pope John Paul II. The mascot is the Centurion.

On May 1, 2011, the high school changed its name to Blessed John Paul II High School, in honor of John Paul II's beatification. It later changed its name again, to St. John Paul II High School, in honor of John Paul II's canonization as a Saint in the Catholic Church.

Mascot
The Centurion was a Roman officer commanding a century or a company, the strength of which varied between fifty and one hundred men in this era. The centurion was the most important and most respected officer in the Roman Army. He was a leader who rose from the common ranks to high authority, selected for his excellence and example.

This type of character and virtue in this man is what John Paul II High School seeks to teach and instill in its students, both in the academic and athletic endeavors.

The mascot is based on the logo of the Cologne Centurions, with the red color changed to gold.

Academics
The school has a college preparatory education. This means students are required to take four years of English, Science, Math, Social Studies, and Catholic Theology, as well as requiring several other non-core credits, those being in computer technology, communication applications, fine arts, and physical education. There are also a number of elective credits required for graduation.

Athletics, Clubs, & Extracurriculars
Athletics include: football, basketball, soccer, volleyball, baseball, softball, golf, tennis, swimming, track & field, cross country, dance team, drill team, and cheerleading. The varsity baseball team won the TAPPS 4A State Championship 2 years in a row in 2010 & 2011.

The school also competes in "Challenge!", a televised academic contest/tournament hosted by the local PBS station. The Centurions typically make a strong showing each year, and won the competition outright in 2011 and 2012.

Clubs at the school include Voices that Care (a public service club), Health Careers Club, Centurions for Life (an anti-abortion activism club), Student Council, and Pan American Student Forum, as well as three honor societies: Sociedad Honoraria Hispanica (Spanish honor society), National English Honor Society, and National Honor Society.

Notable people

Alumni
 Jose Trevino, professional baseball catcher for the New York Yankees.

Notes and references

External links
 Roman Catholic Diocese of Corpus Christi
 School Website

Catholic secondary schools in Texas
Educational institutions established in 2006
High schools in Corpus Christi, Texas
2006 establishments in Texas